The 1978 LPGA Championship was the 24th LPGA Championship, held June 8–11 at Jack Nicklaus Golf Center at Kings Island in Mason, Ohio, a suburb northeast of Cincinnati.

Nancy Lopez, a 21-year-old tour rookie, won the first of her three major titles, all at the LPGA Championship at Kings Island. She finished at 275 (−13), six strokes ahead of runner-up 

This was the first of twelve consecutive LPGA Championships at Kings Island; the last one in 1989 was also won by Lopez.

Past champions in the field

Made the cut

Source:

Missed the cut

Source:

Final leaderboard
Sunday, June 11, 1978

Source:

References

External links
Golf Observer leaderboard
The Golf Center at Kings Island

Women's PGA Championship
Golf in Ohio
LPGA Championship
LPGA Championship
LPGA Championship
LPGA Championship
Women's sports in Ohio